Mihail Ghecev (born 5 November 1997) is a Moldovan footballer who plays as a midfielder for Mynai.

Career
Ghecev made his professional debut for Sfântul Gheorghe in the Moldovan National Division on 9 July 2017, with the match against Dacia Chișinău finishing as a 0–1 loss.

In January 2023 he moved to Mynai.

International
He made his Moldova national football team debut on 10 September 2019 in a Euro 2020 qualifier against Turkey. He substituted Artur Ioniță in the 81st minute.

References

External links
 
 
 
 

1997 births
Living people
People from Leova District
Moldovan footballers
Moldovan expatriate footballers
Moldova international footballers
Association football midfielders
FC Sfîntul Gheorghe players
CS Petrocub Hîncești players
FC Sheriff Tiraspol players
NK Veres Rivne players
Moldovan Super Liga players
Ukrainian Premier League players
Expatriate footballers in Ukraine
Moldovan expatriate sportspeople in Ukraine